"Faith" is a song by Swedish rock band Ghost. It was their third single off of their fourth studio album Prequelle. It peaked at number six on the Billboard Mainstream Rock Songs chart in September 2019.

Background
The song title was first revealed in February 2018, and later debuted in a live setting in early May 2018, almost a month prior to its release on its respective studio album, Prequelle. A music video was released on December 20, 2018. The video consists of live performance footage from the band's North American leg of their tour "A Pale Tour Named Death", and was released to celebrate the completion of the first leg of the tour. The video was directed by Bill Yukich. The video includes footage of crowds watching the band performing the song in front of the stage backdrop that was made to look like the outside of a church, with stained glass windows showing off incarnations of Cardinal Copia and Papa Emeritus.

Composition and themes
The song is an original composition, of no relation to the frequently covered George Michael song "Faith". The song contains "soaring" heavy guitar riffs and "gospel-adjacent melodies". The song is one of few that features frontman Tobias Forge on lead guitar. Forge said of his guitar-work on the track: 
Loudwire described the song as "one of the more metal moments of Prequelle, and interpreted its lyrics to be Forge's response to being taken to court by earlier members of the band in 2017, which Forge went on to win, notably with the lines "A fecal trail across the land  /Although it stinks, feels, and looks identical / A pack of fools take the stand."

Personnel
Credits adapted from liner notes.
 
Tobias Forge – vocals (credited as "Cardinal Copia"), lead guitar
A Group of Nameless Ghouls – rhythm guitar, bass guitar, keyboards, drums

Charts

References

2018 songs
2019 singles
Ghost (Swedish band) songs
Loma Vista Recordings singles
Songs written by Tobias Forge
Songs written by Tom Dalgety
Song recordings produced by Tom Dalgety